Universal City/Studio City station is an underground rapid transit (known locally as a subway) station on the B Line of the Los Angeles Metro Rail system. It is located under Lankershim Boulevard at its intersection of Campo de Cahuenga and Universal Hollywood Drive in the neighborhoods of Universal City and Studio City, after which the station is named.

The station is located near the Universal Studios Hollywood theme park, the Universal CityWalk entertainment complex, and the NBCUniversal studio complex. The station was built around the historic Campo de Cahuenga, an adobe ranch house where the Treaty of Cahuenga was signed in 1847, ending hostilities in California between Mexico and the United States.

Location 

Universal City/Studio City station lies within the Los Angeles neighborhood of Studio City, specifically at the intersection of Lankershim Boulevard, Campo de Cahuenga and Universal Terrace Parkway. Universal City/Studio City station straddles the hills between the Los Angeles Basin to the south and the San Fernando Valley to the north. Just southeast of the station, across the Hollywood Freeway (U.S. Route 101) is the Cahuenga Pass, consisting of a strip of shops, restaurants and offices that follow US 101, but along Cahuenga Boulevard, which parallels the freeway through the pass.

Universal Studios 
Universal City/Studio City station serves the nearby Universal Studios Hollywood theme park, the Universal CityWalk entertainment complex, along with the Hilton Universal and Sheraton Universal hotels. Beyond the tourist attractions, the station also serves the working Universal Studios Lot, the Brokaw News Center (KNBC, KVEA, Telemundo and NBC news bureaus) and the 10 Universal City Plaza office building.

To access the tourist attractions, riders cross the street using a pedestrian bridge and board a tram to go to CityWalk and the theme park. A pedestrian tunnel was originally proposed by Metro but was ultimately scrapped because of NBCUniversal's reluctance to pay the growing costs of the project.

History 
In the early planning stages in the 1980s, Universal City/ Studio City station was originally going to be an elevated station; but due to local opposition and safety concerns, the station was put underground as a subway station. Part of MOS-3 of the Red Line, Universal City/Studio City opened on June 24, 2000, as part of an extension from Hollywood/Vine to North Hollywood, the latter of which remains the line's northwestern terminus.

Universal, in conjunction with Metro, constructed a pedestrian bridge over Lankershim Boulevard and Universal Hollywood Drive that opened in April 2016. NBCUniversal agreed to fund a portion of the $19.5 million project, while the remainder was funded through Proposition A.

Service

Station layout 
The Universal City/Studio City station lies underground, in this case beneath Bluffside Drive at its intersection with Campo de Cahuenga. Access is provided by two entrances, one on the northwest and the other on the southwest corner of the intersection between Lankershim Boulevard and Campo de Cahuenga.

The station features a park and ride lot. There are a few public bus lines that stop or terminate at the bus plaza on the west side of Lankershim Boulevard, adjacent to the station while others are found by crossing to the east side of Lankershim Boulevard.

Hours and frequency

Connections 
, the following connections are available:
 Burbank Bus: Pink Route
 Universal City Shuttle

References 

B Line (Los Angeles Metro) stations
Studio City, Los Angeles
Universal City, California
Public transportation in the San Fernando Valley
Railway stations in the United States opened in 2000
2000 establishments in California